Catherine Amanda Morgan is a New Zealand feminist psychology academic, as of 2019 is a full professor at the Massey University.

Academic career

After a 1992 PhD titled  'Strange attractions : discourse, narrative and subjectivity in social psychology'  at Murdoch University, Morgan moved to the Massey University, rising to full professor in 2013.

Morgan was an adviser to the Glenn Inquiry, but resigned from the troubled group in 2013.

Selected works 
 Kahu, Ella, and Mandy Morgan. "A critical discourse analysis of New Zealand government policy: Women as mothers and workers." In Women's Studies International Forum, vol. 30, no. 2, pp. 134–146. Pergamon, 2007.
 Bürgelt, Petra T., Mandy Morgan, and Regina Pernice. "Staying or returning: Pre‐migration influences on the migration process of German migrants to New Zealand." Journal of Community & Applied Social Psychology 18, no. 4 (2008): 282–298.
 Kahu, Ella, and Mandy Morgan. "Weaving cohesive identities: New Zealand women talk as mothers and workers." Kōtuitui: New Zealand Journal of Social Sciences Online 2, no. 2 (2007): 55–73.
 Morgan, Mandy, and Leigh Coombes. "Subjectivities and silences, mother and woman: Theorizing an experience of silence as a speaking subject." Feminism & Psychology 11, no. 3 (2001): 361–375.
 O'Neill, Damian, and Mandy Morgan. "Pragmatic post‐structuralism (I): participant observation and discourse in evaluating violence intervention." Journal of Community & Applied Social Psychology 11, no. 4 (2001): 263–275.

References

External links
 

Living people
1955 births
New Zealand women academics
Murdoch University alumni
Academic staff of the Massey University